ICPD may refer to:

 Institute of Continuing Professional Development
 International Conference on Population and Development
 Iowa City Police Department
International Center for Peace and Development

See also 
 ICPDR